"Can't Control Myself" is a song from Australian pop group Wa Wa Nee. The song was released in November 1988 as the lead single from their second studio album, Blush (1989). The song peaked at number 31 on the Australian ARIA Charts.

Track listing 
7" (CBS – 653162)
Side A "Can't Control Myself" – 3:36
Side B "Happy (Part 1)" – 2:35

12"'
Side A "Can't Control Myself" (The Ean Sugarman & Stan Michael Remix) – 6:29
Side B "Can't Control Myself" (AJA Smiley Remix) – 5:07
Side B "Can't Control Myself" (Hysteria Mix) – 7:51

Charts

References 

1988 songs
1988 singles
Wa Wa Nee songs
Songs written by Paul Gray (songwriter)
CBS Records singles